The EAR 13 class was a class of  gauge  steam locomotives built by North British Locomotive Company in Glasgow, Scotland, for the East African Railways (EAR).

The 18 members of the class were built in 1952 and entered service in 1953.  They were later converted into s, because of a tendency to de-rail when operating in reverse, using bogies (trucks) salvaged from EAR 50 class Garratt-type locomotives, which were then in the process of being withdrawn from service.

Class member 1315 was for many years an exhibit in the Nairobi Railway Museum. However, in 1996 after checking the boiler records of all the museum exhibits, the locomotive was removed from the Museum by Kenya Railways engineers who were in need of a replacement main works stationary boiler. The rest of the locomotive was then scrapped.

See also

History of rail transport in Tanzania
Rail transport in Kenya
Rail transport in Uganda

References

Notes

Bibliography

East African Railways locomotives
Metre gauge steam locomotives
NBL locomotives
Railway locomotives introduced in 1953
Steam locomotives of Kenya
Steam locomotives of Tanzania
Steam locomotives of Uganda
4-8-2T locomotives
4-8-4T locomotives